Yelü Xiezhen (died 999), courtesy name Hanyin (韓隱), was a Khitan general and politician in imperial China's Liao dynasty.

In 969 Yelü Xiezhen became an important general under Emperor Jingzong of Liao. Along with Yelü Xiuge and Yelü Sha, he fought the Song forces many times. In 986 he captured Song general Yang Ye with the help of Yelü Xidi.

In popular culture
Portrayed by Tim Yu in the 2020 Chinese TV series The Legend of Xiao Chuo.

References
  Toqto'a et al., History of Liao, vol. 83 (Yelü Xiezhen)

Liao dynasty generals
999 deaths
Year of birth unknown

Yelü clan
10th-century Khitan people